Torch Song Trilogy is a 1988 American comedy-drama film adapted by Harvey Fierstein from his play of the same name.

The film was directed by Paul Bogart and stars Fierstein as Arnold, Anne Bancroft as Ma Beckoff, Matthew Broderick as Alan, Brian Kerwin as Ed, and Eddie Castrodad as David. Executive Producer Ronald K. Fierstein is Harvey Fierstein's brother.

Fierstein created the role of Bertha Venation Wanting to highlight the work of female impersonator Charles Pierce. Broderick originally refused the role of Alan because he was recuperating from an automobile accident in Northern Ireland. Tate Donovan was cast, but two days into the rehearsal period Broderick had a change of heart and contacted Fierstein, who fired Donovan.

Although the play was over four hours, the film was restricted to a running time of two hours at the insistence of New Line Cinema, necessitating much editing and excisions. The time period the film covers is several years earlier than the time period of the original play.

Plot
 1971: Arnold (Harvey Fierstein), a New York City female impersonator,  meets Ed (Brian Kerwin), a bisexual schoolteacher, and they fall in love. Ed, however, is uncomfortable with his sexuality and he leaves Arnold for a girlfriend, Laurel.
 1973–79: During Christmas, Arnold meets the love of his life, a model named Alan (Matthew Broderick). They settle down together, later spending a weekend with Ed and Laurel in the country, where their relationship is tested but endures. Eventually, they apply to foster a child together with a view to adoption, and their application is eventually successful and so they move to a bigger apartment. However, on their first night at their new home, Alan is killed in a homophobic attack.
 1980: Months later, in the spring of 1980, Arnold's mother (Anne Bancroft) comes to visit from Florida, but her visit leads to a long-overdue confrontation. Arnold's mother disapproves of Arnold's homosexuality and his planned adoption of a gay teenage son, David (Eddie Castrodad), as well as Arnold's use of their family burial plot for Alan. They have a series of arguments where Arnold demands that she accept him for who he is, insisting that if she can't then she has no place in his life. The following morning, before she returns to Florida, they have a conversation where, for the first time, they seem to understand each other. With both David and Ed (who is now more mature and settled) in his life, and a successful new career creating his own stage revue, Arnold's life is finally complete.

Cast
 Harvey Fierstein as Arnold Beckoff
 Anne Bancroft as Ma Beckoff
 Matthew Broderick as Alan Simon
 Brian Kerwin as Ed
 Karen Young as Laurel
 Eddie Castrodad as David
 Ken Page as Murray
 Charles Pierce as Bertha Venation
 Axel Vera as Marina Del Ray

Soundtrack

The soundtrack for Torch Song Trilogy was released on the Polydor label on LP, cassette, and CD on December 8, 1988. The album charted on the jazz charts of industry magazines Billboard and Cashbox.

The song "This Time the Dream's On Me" sung by Ella Fitzgerald, which is used several times throughout the film including over the closing credits, was excised from the planned soundtrack album by Norman Granz, Fitzgerald's long-time manager, when he invoked a contractual clause which gave Fitzgerald the right to refuse her material to appear on an album featuring another artist (known in the music industry as a "coupling clause").  In actuality, Granz was unhappy with the money offered by the record company, PolyGram Records (now part of Universal Music), for the use of the song in the film and refused permission for its inclusion on the album out of spite.

Original music by Peter Matz and contemporary pop tunes such as Rod Stewart's "Maggie May" were used in the film, but not contained on the soundtrack as its producers, Larry L. Lash and Matz, felt they broke the overall "torch song" theme of the album. The track listing is as follows:

 "'S Wonderful" – Count Basie Orchestra, Joe Williams
 "Dames" – Harvey Fierstein, Nick Montgomery, Robert Neary, Ken Page, Charles Pierce, Axel Vera
 "But Not for Me" – Billie Holiday
 "Body and Soul" – Charlie Haden Quartet West
 "Svelte" – Harvey Fierstein
 "Skylark" – Marilyn Scott
 "I Loves You, Porgy" – Bill Evans
 "Can't We Be Friends?" – Anita O'Day
 "Love for Sale" – Harvey Fierstein
 "What's New?" – Billie Holiday

Home media

Torch Song Trilogy was released on VHS in 1989, and on DVD in May 2004. The DVD version contains an audio commentary track by actor and writer Harvey Fierstein.

Reception
Torch Song Trilogy was generally well received by critics, with reviews from Variety, Time Out, Roger Ebert and Janet Maslin all praising the film. It holds a 75% score on Rotten Tomatoes based on 20 reviews.

Janet Maslin from The New York Times wrote “Like La Cage aux Folles, Torch Song Trilogy presents a homosexual world that any mother, with the possible exception of Arnold Beckoff’s, would love. Greatly shortened from Mr. Fierstein’s long-running, Tony Award-winning play, the film version emphasizes the lovable at every turn, but the surprise is that it does this entertainingly and well.” Roger Ebert commented “As written and performed by Harvey Fierstein as a long-running stage hit, it was seen as a sort of nostalgic visit to the problems that gays had in the years before the horror of AIDS. The movie has more or less the same focus, but because it’s a movie, it becomes more intimate and intense.”

Awards and nominations
At the 1989 Deauville Film Festival, director Paul Bogart was nominated for the Critics Award and won the Audience Award. The film was also nominated for Best Feature and Fierstein was nominated for Best Male Lead at the Independent Spirit Awards that same year.

References

External links
 
 
 

1988 films
1988 comedy-drama films
1988 LGBT-related films
American comedy-drama films
American LGBT-related films
Cross-dressing in American films
Films directed by Paul Bogart
LGBT-related films based on actual events
Films set in New York (state)
Films set in the 1970s
Films shot in New Jersey
Films shot in New York (state)
Films shot in California
LGBT-related comedy-drama films
Films about LGBT and Judaism
1988 comedy films
1988 drama films
1980s English-language films
1980s American films